The Croatian Second County League (or commonly 2. ŽNL) is a county-based seventh level league in the Croatian football league system.

Leagues 

The 2. ŽNL features 17 different county leagues and has around 371 teams. While all 17 leagues are part of the 2. ŽNL umbrella, the leagues are completely separate from each other and have no interaction with each other. 

The leagues in the 2. ŽNL are:

See also
Croatian football league system

References

Football leagues in Croatia
Seventh level football leagues in Europe